Shift (stylized as shift by msnbc, formerly msnbc2) was an online live-streaming video network run by MSNBC. It was launched in July 2014 to provide a platform for original video series which diverge from the MSNBC television network's political focus.

History
In July 2014, MSNBC.com launched msnbc2, a brand for several web-only series hosted by MSNBC personalities, in December 2014, msnbc2 was renamed shift by msnbc, with a daily live stream and programming schedule which was less focused on politics and is more tailored to a younger audience. The channel was later shut down.

Programming

Programs
 Sports Matters hosted by Rob Simmelkjaer (released Mondays)
 Reporter's Notebook hosted by Beth Fouhy (released Mondays)
 Changing America hosted by Voto Latino CEO Maria Teresa Kumar (released Tuesdays)
 The Docket hosted by attorney Seema Iyer (released Tuesdays)
 The Book Report hosted by Richard Wolffe (released Tuesdays)
 Road Map hosted by Ayman Mohyeldin (released Wednesdays)
 Nerding Out hosted by Dorian Warren (released Thursdays)
 Code Forward hosted by Nellie Bowles and Jason Del Rey (co-produced by Re/code, released Thursdays)
 The Briefing hosted by Luke Russert (released Fridays)
 So Popular! hosted by Janet Mock (released Fridays)
 Just Faith hosted by Rev. Jacqui Lewis (released Fridays)
 REACH! hosted by Natalie Auzenne (released Saturdays)
 shift-only version of First Look hosted by Betty Nguyen
 msnbc Originals
 Three Cents hosted by Josh Barro
 Krystal Clear hosted by Krystal Ball
 Out There hosted by Thomas Roberts
 Greenhouse hosted by Tony Dokoupil

See also
 HuffPost Live
 CBS News (streaming service)
 AJ+
 NBC News Now
 ABC News Live

References

American political websites
American news websites
Internet television channels
Defunct video on demand services
Internet properties established in 2014
Internet properties disestablished in 2016
2014 establishments in the United States
2016 disestablishments in the United States
MSNBC
NBCUniversal networks